Vernaccia is a white Italian wine, made from the Vernaccia grape, produced in and around the Italian hill town of San Gimignano in Tuscany. It was the first Italian wine to be awarded Denominazione di Origine Controllata (DOC) status in 1966; on July 9th, 1993 it was upgraded to Denominazione di Origine Controllata e Garantita (DOCG).

History
The earliest recorded mention of the wine appears in the archives of record of San Gimignano from 1276. Due to the difficulties in cultivating the Vernaccia grape, the wine fell out of favor in the early 20th century as the more prolific Trebbiano and Malvasia grapes were planted. By the 1960s, Vernaccia di San Gimignano experienced a resurgence as its distinctive, crisp qualities established it as a popular alternative to the blander wines produced from Trebbiano and Malvasia blends.

Viticulture and winemaking
The name "Vernaccia" is applied to several different Italian grapes, such as the Sardinian grape used in Vernaccia di Oristano and the Marche grape used in the sparkling red wine Vernaccia di Serrapetrona. Ampelographers have determined that the variety grown in San Gimignano is different and distinct from the other Italian Vernaccias and is probably not related. The Tuscan variety is believed to be the oldest grape variety but its origins are not clear with ampelographers disagreeing if it originally came from Eastern Europe, Greece or is indigenous to the Italian peninsula.

In San Gimignano, the Vernaccia grapes planted in sandstone based vineyards tend to produce the best examples of Vernaccia di San Gimignano. The wine is characteristically dry with crisp acidity and a slightly bitter finish. Most consider Vernaccia di San Gimignano to be a simple, everyday white; its popularity being owed less to what is in the glass and more to it being the local wine of San Gimignano, one of Tuscany's most touristy towns.   Despite this reputation, modern winemaking has introduced the use of oak aging to give the wine another layer of complexity and roundness. While very different from the historic style of Vernaccia di San Gimignano, the success of these more modern and international styles has not yet been established.

According to DOC regulations, Vernaccia di San Gimignano must contain 90% Vernaccia, with up to 10% other nonaromatic approved white varieties.  In order to meet "riserva" status, aging must be a minimum of twelve months, including four months in bottle..

Vernaccia in literature
Vernaccia is mentioned by Dante Alighieri (Purgatorio XXIV) as leading to Pope Martin IV's gluttony.  He ate Bolsena eels pickled in the wine. 

Vernaccia was also praised by Francesco Redi in his work, "Baccio in Toscana" (1685)..

Vernaccia is mentioned by Cecco Angiolieri in an untitled poem: "--S'i' gli avvessi chèsto di vernaccia!--".

References

External links
 History of Vernaccia Wine from sangimignano.net

Italian DOCG
Wines of Tuscany
San Gimignano

ca:Vernaccia
nl:Vernaccia di San Gimignano